William Pendrill (died 1705) was a Roman Catholic and royalist in the English Civil War.

Pendrill and his five brothers were the occupants of Boscobel House in Shropshire where in 1651 they secreted the defeated King Charles II in an oak tree after the Battle of Worcester. The tree became known as the Royal Oak.

He is remembered in the Penderel's Oak public house in London's High Holborn.

References

External links

The royal miracle; a collection of rare tracts, broadsides, letters, prints, & ballads concerning the wanderings of Charles II. after the battle of Worcester (September 3-October 15, 1651), London, S. Paul & co. (1912)

1705 deaths
18th-century English people
17th-century English people
English Roman Catholics